The Chulym is a river in the endorheic drainage basin of Lake Chany in the southeastern part of the West Siberian Plain in Russia.

Course
The river flows over the Baraba Steppe in a southwesterly direction, and flows through the lakes of Sargul (Russian: Саргуль), and Uryum (Russian: Урюм), before it finally terminates, at  elevation, in Lake Malye Chany (Russian: Малые Чаны – Little Chany), which is connected to Lake Chany through a short strait.

Its main tributaries are the Suma River (left), and the Kargat River (right).

In its upper course is the town of Chulym, named after the river. Here the river is crossed by the Trans-Siberian Railway and the M51 highway.

The Chulym is frozen over from November to April or May.

See also
List of rivers of Russia

References

Rivers of Novosibirsk Oblast
Endorheic basins of Asia